USS Bartlett may refer to the following ships operated by the United States Navy:

 , a schooner acquired by the United States Navy in 1861
 , an oceanographic research vessel in United States Navy service from 1969 to 1993

United States Navy ship names